Deltaspis disparilis is a species of beetle in the family Cerambycidae. It was described by Bates in 1891.

References

Deltaspis
Beetles described in 1891